Monetate was an American software company founded in 2008 that provided multivariant testing and personalization software for online retailers.

History
Headquartered in Conshohocken, Pennsylvania with offices in Palo Alto and London, England, Monetate was founded in 2008 by David Brussin and David Bookspan.

In July 2014, Monetate had about 230 employees.

In October 2019, Monetate was acquired by Kibo, a cloud commerce provider wholly owned by Vista Equity Partners for an undisclosed sum. As of 2021, the Monetate brand has been discontinued by Kibo. 

In October 2022, Kibo spun out personalization business under the relaunched Monetate brand, including the products of Monetate and Certona.  The newly relaunched brand was sold to Center Lane Partners, a private investment firm.

References

Companies based in Conshohocken, Pennsylvania
Software companies established in 2008
Multinational companies headquartered in the United States
Providers of services to on-line companies
Defunct privately held companies of the United States
Software companies based in Pennsylvania
Defunct software companies of the United States
2008 establishments in Pennsylvania
Software companies disestablished in 2019
2019 disestablishments in Pennsylvania
2019 mergers and acquisitions